Lily Chung Suk Wai (鍾淑慧) (born April 4, 1969) is a Hong Kong based actress, she graduated from Hong Kong University. 

She represented Hong Kong at the Miss Universe 1987 pageant. She worked for TVB until 1993. She is married to actor Hugo Ng (吳岱融).

Filmography
 The Infernal Fighter (2004)
 Be Out Control (2003)
 Blood on Bullet (2003)
 Killing Betrayer (2003)
 Snake Lover (2003)
 Teenage Gambler (2003)
 We're No Heroes (2003)
 Dangerous Relationship (2002)
 Deadline Crisis (2002)
 Deadly Past (2002)
 Dragon the Master (2002)
 Final Edge (2002)
 Home Ghost (2002)
 Killing Skill (2002)
 Shadow Mask (2001)
 Spy Gear (2001)
 The Story of Freeman (2001)
 Fatal Attraction (2000)
 Legend of Wind (2000)
 Pursuit of a Killer (2000)
 Millennium Dragon (1999)
 No Time for Two (1999)
 The Hero of Swallow (1996)
 The Wild Couple (1996)
 Die Harder (1995)
 The Eternal Evil of Asia (1995)
 Husbands & Wives (1995)
 Midnight Caller (1995) (cameo)
 O.C.T.B. Case : The Floating Body (1995)
 A Step to Heaven (1995)
 The Woman Behind (1995)
 Brother of Darkness (1994)
 Fatal Encounter (1994)
 Fatal Obsession (1994)
 The Modern Love (1994)
 Red to Kill (1994)
 The Bride with White Hair 2 (1993)
 Daughter of Darkness (1993)
 Supernormal II (1993)
 The Rapist Beckons (1992)
 The Zu Mountain Saga (1991)
 Midnight Angel (1990)

References

External links
 
 HK cinemagic entry
 hkmdb entry
 lovehkfilm entry

1969 births
Actresses from Guangdong
Chinese film actresses
Chinese television actresses
Living people
Hong Kong film actresses
Hong Kong television actresses
Miss Universe 1987 contestants
People from Meizhou
Hong Kong people of Hakka descent
Singaporean people of Hakka descent
Hong Kong emigrants to Singapore